The 2022–23 Holy Cross Crusaders women's basketball team represents the College of the Holy Cross during the 2022–23 NCAA Division I women's basketball season. The Crusaders, led by third year head coach Maureen Magarity, play their home games at the Hart Center and are members of the Patriot League.

Roster

Schedule

|-
!colspan=9 style=| Non-conference regular season

|-
!colspan=9 style=| Patriot League regular season

|-
!colspan=9 style=| Patriot League Women's Tournament

|-
!colspan=9 style=| NCAA Women's Tournament

See also
 2022–23 Holy Cross Crusaders men's basketball team

References

Holy Cross
Holy Cross Crusaders women's basketball seasons
Holy Cross Crusaders women's basketball
Holy Cross Crusaders women's basketball
Holy Cross